Emanate is the debut studio album by the French gothic metal band Penumbra, launched in 1999 originally under German label Serenades Records.

Track listing 
 "Intro" - 02:11
 "Lycantrope"- 04:41
 "New Searing Senses" - 06:26
 "Bloody Experience" - 06:10
 "Falling into My Soul" - 09:39
 "Turn Them Off" - 06:40
 "Doppleganger" - 06:02
 "Underwater Dream" - 06:49

Personnel

Penumbra 
Jarlaath - Vocals, Oboe
Scyllia - Vocals
Medusa - Vocals
Dorian	- Guitars
Aldric	- Bass
Zoltan	- Keyboards
Hekchen - Drums

Additional musician 
Franck Kobolt	- Guitars, Drum programming
Arnaud Chipouka - Vocals
Eric Tabourier	- Drum programming

Production 
Arnaud Chipouka - Engineering (bass, guitars, vocals, oboe), Mixing, Art direction
Franck Kobolt - Mixing, Art direction
Julien Portrat	- Mixing, Engineering (vocals, guitars, oboe)

References

External links 
Metallum Archvies
Discogs.com

1999 albums
Penumbra (band) albums